FASA Studio (formerly FASA Interactive Technologies Inc.) was an American video game developer that was founded in 1994 in Chicago, Illinois by the tabletop game company FASA Corporation.

In 1996, FASA Interactive and Virtual World Entertainment, another company created by FASA Corp. founders Jordan Weisman and L. Ross Babcock, became wholly owned subsidiaries of Virtual World Entertainment Group (VWEG). In 1999, Microsoft Corporation purchased VWEG to acquire the talent at FIT and the intellectual properties of FASA Corp. The VWE component of VWEG was sold to a group headed by VWEG's former CFO, James Garbarini. FASA Interactive then became a FASA Studio, a component of Microsoft Game Studios. As such, the company developed games exclusive to the Windows and Xbox platforms Its headquarters were located in Redmond, Washington, only a few miles from Microsoft Corporation's main campus. 

FASA was officially shut down on September 12, 2007, with only the Community Manager and Technical Support Manager positions remaining active to support their games. Microsoft subsequently licensed the rights to produce electronic adaptations of FASA games back to Weisman, who directed a venture called Smith & Tinker. Smith & Tinker closed down November 8, 2012.

Games developed

MechCommander – PC (1998)
MechWarrior 4: Vengeance – PC (2000)
MechWarrior 4: Black Knight – PC (2001) - with Cyberlore Studios
MechCommander 2 – PC (2001)
MechWarrior 4: Mercenaries – PC (2002) - with Cyberlore Studios
MechAssault – Xbox (2002)
Crimson Skies: High Road to Revenge – Xbox (2003)
MechAssault 2: Lone Wolf – Xbox (2004)
Shadowrun – PC, Xbox 360 (2007)

References

External links
FASA Studios

Former Microsoft subsidiaries
Defunct video game companies of the United States
Video game development companies
Defunct companies based in Redmond, Washington
Defunct companies based in Washington (state)
Video game companies established in 1994
Video game companies disestablished in 2007
1994 establishments in Washington (state)
2007 disestablishments in Washington (state)